Hot Country Songs is a chart that ranks the top-performing country music songs in the United States, published by Billboard magazine.  In 1988, 49 different songs topped the chart, then published under the title Hot Country Singles, in 53 issues of the magazine, based on playlists submitted by country music radio stations and sales reports submitted by stores.

Only four songs spent more than a single week at number one in 1988: "Eighteen Wheels and a Dozen Roses" by Kathy Mattea, "I Told You So" by Randy Travis, "I'll Leave This World Loving You" by Ricky Van Shelton and "When You Say Nothing at All" by Keith Whitley.  Travis and Shelton each scored two other number ones during the year to give them a total of four weeks in the top spot.  This figure was matched by Rosanne Cash, who achieved three solo number ones and one in collaboration with her then-husband Rodney Crowell, making her the only artist to take four different songs to number one in 1988.  Highway 101, Restless Heart, George Strait and Tanya Tucker each topped the chart with three different songs.

Artists to achieve their first chart-topper in 1988 included Dwight Yoakam, who reached number one with "Streets of Bakersfield", performed as a duet with Buck Owens, who had himself had a hit with the song fifteen years earlier.  The song marked the veteran singer's first appearance at number one since 1972.  The Desert Rose Band achieved the first of its two number ones with "He's Back and I'm Blue", and Paul Overstreet made his first appearance at number one when he collaborated with Tanya Tucker and Paul Davis on "I Won't Take Less Than Your Love".  Overstreet achieved intermittent success as a singer but is better known as a songwriter, having written hit songs for many artists.  At the other end of the scale, Merle Haggard topped the chart for the 38th and final time with "Twinkle, Twinkle Lucky Star".  At the time of Haggard's death in 2016, only Conway Twitty (40) and George Strait (44) had taken more songs to the top of the Hot Country chart since Billboard began compiling sales and airplay into a single listing in 1958.  Whitley's "When You Say Nothing at All" was the final number one of the year.  Whitley was at the peak of his commercial success at the time, but would die less than six months later, on May 9, 1989.

Chart history

See also
1988 in music
List of artists who reached number one on the U.S. country chart

References

1988
1988 record charts
Country